Makybe Diva (foaled 21 March 1999) is a champion Australian Thoroughbred racehorse who is the only horse to win three Melbourne Cups and the only mare to win it more than once. She achieved the feat in 2003, 2004, and 2005. She also won the 2005 Cox Plate. She was the highest stakes-earner in Australian history, winning more than A$ 14 million. 

She is by Desert King (a winner of the Irish Derby and Irish 2,000 Guineas) out of Tugela by Riverman (USA).  Tugela was also the dam of the Australian stakes-winners, Musket and Valkyrie Diva. Makybe Diva is owned by South Australian tuna fisherman Tony Šantić, who named her after five of his employees - Maureen, Kylie, Belinda, Diane, and Vanessa - by taking the first two letters from each of their names.

Background
Tony Šantić's bloodstock agent John Foote purchased Tugela in foal to Desert King for 60,000 guineas at the December 1998 Tattersall's Sale. As normally happens with Santic's British-purchased horses, she was taken to Dick Fowlston's Britton House Stud in Somerset to board before being sent on to Australia. Tugela gave birth to a filly at five minutes past midnight on 21 March 1999. The filly was offered for sale at the 1999 Tatts Newmarket foal sale, but did not make the reserve. Named Makybe Diva, the filly remained at Britton House Stud until August 2000, when she and Tugela were shipped to Australia.

Racing career

2002: Three-Year-Old Season
Originally trained by David Hall, Makybe Diva made her racetrack debut in late July 2002, as a three-year-old, in a maiden at Benalla, Victoria, and finished fourth.

2002/2003: Four-Year-Old Season
In her next start two weeks later - and now classed as a four-year-old - Makybe Diva began a six-race winning sequence in a maiden at Wangaratta, which culminated in stakes wins, three months later, in the Werribee Cup (2,000 m) and the Queen Elizabeth Stakes (2,500 m). The last win was significant in that it qualified the mare for the following year's Melbourne Cup, and allowed her trainer to give her a light autumn campaign, which consisted of just two starts in relatively short races.

Makybe Diva's early career was unusual in that she was unable to contest any major races against horses of her own age, such as the VRC Oaks, because she was foaled in the U.K. to the Northern Hemisphere breeding calendar. This meant that, for Australian racing purposes, where horses "age-up" on 1 August each year, she was bracketed with horses foaled about six months earlier, in the Southern Hemisphere spring.

2003/2004: Five-Year-Old Season (Melbourne Cup 1)
Second up at her next start in the Group 3 Stock Stakes, she came from behind to finish fourth, beaten by just over two lengths. She then started 5-1 equal favourite in the Group 2 Turnbull Stakes, where she again raced at the back of the field, before finishing fourth, beaten by only one length.

After finishing as a 14-1 outsider in the Caulfield Cup, she began her partnership with Sydney jockey Glen Boss. The first Tuesday in November 2003 was her first Melbourne Cup victory. Starting as an $8 second favourite, Makybe Diva raced at the back of the field until the finishing straight, where jockey Boss picked his way through the field to win by  lengths. 

In the autumn of 2004, she resumed over 1400 m (7 furlongs) carrying 59.5 kg followed by a third-place finish in the Group 3 Carlyon Cup. Following this, she was blocked when making a winning run in the Australian Cup before being taken to Sydney, where she placed third in the Ranvet Stakes and The BMW Stakes, both Group 1 races. The Group 1 Sydney Cup over 3200 m (2 mi) was to be her final run for the campaign. Sent out as a $3.50 second favourite, she began off the pace, but ran home to record a win by half a length, becoming the first mare to ever win the Sydney Cup/Melbourne Cup double in the same season, and only the fourth horse to have accomplished the double win.

After the 2003–2004 season, trainer David Hall left to train in Hong Kong, and Makybe Diva was transferred to trainer Lee Freedman, generally regarded as one of Australia's top trainers.

2004/2005: Six-Year-Old Season (Melbourne Cup 2)
Her campaign in the spring of 2004 was aimed at winning the Melbourne Cup for a second time. It followed the pattern of her previous cup-winning campaign, though she appeared to be racing better than before. In the 2004 Caulfield Cup, Makybe Diva drew barrier 18 and settled at the back of the field. She was narrowly defeated by Elvstroem, who led all the way.

Makybe Diva was sent out a $3.60 favourite, and won the 2004 Melbourne Cup. In driving rain, the mare defeated a field featuring multiple Irish St. Leger winner Vinnie Roe, Caulfield Cup winners Mummify and Elvstroem, Mamool from the Godolphin stable, and the 2002 Melbourne Cup winner Media Puzzle.

Resuming racing in February, Makybe Diva put in close finishes behind Elvstroem in both the C F Orr Stakes and St George Stakes, at Caulfield. She proceeded to win Sydney's most important WFA race, the BMW Stakes, with a last-to-first burst.

Makybe Diva was named Australian Champion Racehorse of the Year for the 2004/05 season. Along with this, she was also named Australian Champion Stayer and Australian Champion Filly and Mare. A three-quarter brother to Makybe Diva, by Redoute's Choice, was sold in April 2005 for an Australian record price of $2.5 million. Subsequently, named Musket, the colt won his debut at Canterbury in August 2006, and in 2008 won the Gr.2 Shannon Stakes at Rosehill.

2005/2006: Seven-Year-Old Season (Melbourne Cup 3)
Resuming racing in August 2005, Makybe Diva won the Group 2 Memsie Stakes first up, before being defeated by a nose in the Dato Tan Chin Nam Stakes at Moonee Valley. Two weeks later, with a run down the outside of the field, Makybe Diva won the Turnbull Stakes over 2,000 m at Flemington. The mare further enhanced her reputation despite being eight horses wide on the home turn, with a comfortable victory in the 2005 Cox Plate, subsequently beating 2006 winner Fields of Omagh.

Prior to the Melbourne Cup, whether Makybe Diva would start was in doubt, after her connections said she would not run if the track was "too firm". After the VRC decided to water the track, however, she was declared a starter. On 1 November 2005, she made history in winning a record third Melbourne Cup. Settling towards the back of the field, she steadily made ground between runners around the home turn, before hitting the lead with around 300 m to go and holding a comfortable 1-1/4-length margin at the finish. Immediately after the race, trainer Lee Freedman said: 

The win was not without controversy, however. Many, including rival trainers, suggested the track watering amounted to bad sportsmanship employed to give Makybe Diva the best chance to win the race. However, the track condition was upgraded to good straight after the Cup, and the winning time of 3:19.18 was consistent with that rating.

Makybe Diva carried 58 kg during the record third Melbourne Cup, 0.5 kg above the weight-for-age scale for a mare in a 3200m race. The last horse to carry more than weight-for-age and win was Rain Lover, who was 1 kg over when he won his second cup in 1969, with 60.5 kg. In 2005, Makybe Diva broke her own weight-carrying record for a mare of 55.5 kg, which she set in 2004, and became the highest-weighted winner of the Cup since Think Big won his second Melbourne Cup with 58.5 kg in 1975. During the presentation of the Melbourne Cup, owner Tony Šantić announced that Makybe Diva would "retire from racing as of today".

At the end of the 2005–06 season, Makybe Diva was named Australian Champion Racehorse of the Year for the second time, becoming just the third horse to win that accolade more than once. She was also named Australian Champion Stayer, winning this award for the third consecutive year, as well as Australian Champion Middle Distance Racehorse.

Breeding career
On 10 August 2006, it was announced that Makybe Diva would be served by Epsom Derby winner Galileo at Coolmore Stud.

At 3:16 on the morning of 17 August 2007, AEST time, Makybe Diva gave birth to her first foal, named Rockstardom, at Coolmore Stud in the Hunter Valley of NSW. Sold for AU$1.5 million as a yearling in 2009, he won two races in 12 starts, earning $26,115 over three years. Rockstardom was gelded and died of a skull fracture in his stall at C. Waller's stables on 26 July 2013.

Makybe Diva was due to be served by Encosta De Lago in the spring of 2007 until the outbreak of equine influenza forced the stud to be quarantined. Owner Tony Šantić sent the Diva to American champion Fusaichi Pegasus, instead. On 20 August 2008, Makybe gave birth to her second foal, a filly by the aforementioned Fusaichi Pegasus. This filly, later named La Dolce Diva, sold at auction for $1.2 million to trainer Mark Kavanagh of Melbourne. Makybe Diva had a colt on 28 August 2009 by Encosta De Lago and was covered by More Than Ready for the 2010 season, but she did not produce a foal in 2010.

Makybe Diva gave birth to her fourth foal, a bay colt by Lonhro, on 16 August 2011 in Victoria. Her fifth foal, born in September 2012, is a colt sired by High Chaparral.

Awards
In 2006, the inaugural Spirit of Sport Award (for 2005) was given to Makybe Diva and her connections (Lee Freedman, Tony Šantić, and Glen Boss) by the Sport Australia Hall of Fame for her three successive Melbourne Cups. Spirit of Sport Award site

On 4 July 2006, Makybe Diva was inducted into the Australian Racing Hall of Fame.

As announced on 5 August 2006, Makybe Diva has been honoured at Flemington Racecourse with a life-sized bronze statue, in recognition of her historic three Melbourne Cup wins. A life-sized bronze statue was also erected on the foreshore in Šantić's home town of Port Lincoln, South Australia.

Makybe Diva headed the International Federation of Horseracing Authorities ratings for the 2005-06 official end-of-season assessment. She was given a rating of 124, ahead of Electrocutionist, David Junior. and Heart's Cry on 123. At a ceremony in Melbourne on 5 September 2010, held in conjunction with the Australian Horse of the Year awards, Makybe Diva was officially inducted into the Australian Racing Hall of Fame.

Race Record

Pedigree

 Makybe Diva is inbred 4 × 4 x 4 to the stallion Northern Dancer, meaning that Northern Dancer appears three times in the fourth generation of her pedigree. In turn, this means she has six great-great-grandsires instead of eight.

See also
 List of historical horses
 List of leading Thoroughbred racehorses
 List of millionaire racehorses in Australia
 Repeat winners of horse races

References

Further reading

External links

1999 racehorse births
Racehorses bred in the United Kingdom
Racehorses trained in Australia
Melbourne Cup winners
Sydney Cup winners
Cox Plate winners
Australian Champion Racehorse of the Year
Australian Racing Hall of Fame horses
Horse monuments
Thoroughbred family 9-f
Individual mares